Zungoli is a town and comune   in the province of Avellino, Campania, southern Italy, about  from the town of Avellino.

Located in Irpinia historical district between the Ufita Valley and Daunian Mountains, Zungoli is awarded two quality marks: Bandiera arancione and I Borghi più belli d'Italia.

Zungoli is believed to have been settled around 900 AD.  Many of the Italians in Dobbs Ferry in the U.S. state of New York are descendants of immigrants from Zungoli, as are communities of Italians in Bristol UK.

The town is part of the Roman Catholic Diocese of Ariano Irpino-Lacedonia and its territory borders the municipalities of Anzano di Puglia, Ariano Irpino, Flumeri, Monteleone di Puglia, San Sossio Baronia, and Villanova del Battista.

References

External links

 Official website

Cities and towns in Campania